Contact from the Underworld of Redboy is an album by Robbie Robertson. It was released in 1998 by Capitol Records. The album is composed of music inspired by Aboriginal Canadian music (including traditional Aboriginal Canadian songs and chants), as well as modern rock, trip hop, and electronica, with the various styles often integrated together in the same song. It features many guest artists.

The album peaked at No. 119 on the Billboard 200.

Critical reception
AllMusic wrote that Robertson's "lyrical and musical concerns can get bogged down in their own pretensions, but often, the results are provocative and unique."

Track listing
 "The Sound Is Fading" featuring Leah Hicks-Manning (lyrics: traditional; music: Howie Bernstein, Robbie Robertson) – 5:00
 "The Code of Handsome Lake" (Robertson) – 6:11
 "Making a Noise" (Robertson) – 5:11
 "Unbound" (Robertson, Tim Gordine) – 4:35
 "Sacrifice" featuring Leonard Peltier (Robertson, Marius de Vries, Peltier) – 6:18
 "Rattlebone" (Robertson, de Vries) – 4:26
 "Peyote Healing" featuring Verdell Primeaux and Johnny Mike (lyrics: Primeaux, Mike; music: de Vries, Robertson) – 6:10
 "In the Blood" (Robertson, Gordine) – 4:35
 "Stomp Dance (Unity)" featuring The Six Nations Women Singers (Robertson, Jim Wilson; traditional) – 4:49
 "The Lights" (Robertson, Bernstein) – 5:54
 "Take Your Partner by the Hand (Red Alert Mix)" (Robertson, Bernstein) – 6:43 [bonus track]

Personnel

1. "The Sound Is Fading"
 Produced by Howie B and Robbie Robertson
 Engineered and Mixed by Howie B
 Featuring Leah Hicks-Manning – vocals
 Jeremy Shaw – keyboards and tuning
 Jules Brooks – keyboards
 Jony Rockstar – programming
 Robbie Robertson – guitar and vocals

2.  "The Code of Handsome Lake"
 Produced by Marius de Vries and Robbie Robertson
 Mixed by Andy Bradfield and Marius de Vries
 Joanne Shenandoah – vocals
 James Bilagody – vocals
 Chief Jake Thomas – spoken word
 Marius de Vries – keyboards and programming
 Robbie Robertson – guitar and vocals

3.  "Making a Noise"
 Produced by Howie B, Marius de Vries and Robbie Robertson
 Engineered and Mixed by Howie B
 James Bilagody, Jackie Bird, Star Nayea, Ivan Neville, Rita Coolidge, Cree Summer – vocals
 Jeremy Shaw – keyboards and tuning
 Jony Rockstar – programming
 Marius de Vries – programming
 Geoffrey Gordon – frame drum
 David Campbell – string arrangement
 Robbie Robertson – guitar and vocals

4.  "Unbound"
 Produced by Tim Gordine and Robbie Robertson
 Engineered and Mixed by Tim Gordine
 Rupert Brown – drums
 Caroline MacKendrick – vocals
 Tim Gordine – keyboards and programming
 Robbie Robertson – guitar and vocals

5.  "Sacrifice"
 Produced by Marius de Vries and Robbie Robertson
 Mixed by Andy Bradfield and Marius de Vries
 Featuring Leonard Peltier – spoken word
 Bonnie Jo Hunt – vocals
 Anthony Begay – vocals
 Maztl Galindo – flute
 Benito Concha – drum
 Marius de Vries – keyboards and programming
 Robbie Robertson – guitar and vocals

6.  "Rattlebone"
 Produced by Marius de Vries and Robbie Robertson
 Mixed by Carmen Rizzo and Marius de Vries
 Tudjaat (Madeleine Allakariallak and Phoebe Atagotaaluk) – throat singing
 James Bilagody – vocals
 Cree Summer – vocals
 Marius de Vries – keyboards and programming
 Robbie Robertson – guitar and vocals

7.  "Peyote Healing"
 Produced by Marius de Vries and Robbie Robertson
 Mixed by Andy Bradfield and Marius de Vries
 Featuring Verdell Primeaux and Johnny Mike – vocals
 Geoffrey Gordon, Jim Wilson – drums and percussion
 Marius de Vries – keyboards and programming
 Robbie Robertson – guitar

8.  "In the Blood"
 Produced by Tim Gordine and Robbie Robertson
 Engineered by Tim Gordine and Mixed by Chris Fogel
 Jony Rockstar – programming
 Caroline MacKendrick – vocals
 Tim Gordine – keyboards and programming
 Robbie Robertson – guitar and vocals

9.  "Stomp Dance (Unity)"
 Produced by Jim Wilson and Robbie Robertson
 Mixed by Carmen Rizzo
 The Six Nations Women Singers – vocals
  Rita Coolidge, Priscilla Coolidge, Laura Satterfield, Star Nayea – vocals
 Geoffrey Gordon – percussion
 Joel Shearer – bass
 Jim Wilson – keyboards and programming
 Vinez Pvel – re-programming
 Andrew Scheps – programming
 Robbie Robertson – guitar and vocals

10.  "The Lights"
 Produced by Howie B and Robbie Robertson
 Engineered and Mixed by Howie B
 Laura Satterfield – vocals
 Jony Rockstar – programming and NC-303 treatment
 Bill Dillon – guitar
 Jeremy Shaw – keyboards and tuning
 Robbie Robertson – guitar and vocals

11.  "Take Your Partner by the Hand (Red Alert Mix)"
 Remix by DJ Premier

References

1998 albums
Capitol Records albums
Electronic albums by Canadian artists
Robbie Robertson albums
albums produced by Howie B
Albums produced by Robbie Robertson
Albums produced by DJ Premier
albums produced by Marius de Vries
Juno Award for Indigenous Music Album of the Year albums